, real name , is a Japanese singer born on October 6, 1971 in Bungo-ōno, Ōita, Japan. Two of her songs have been featured in anime, Glass Kiss in the Maison Ikkoku movie and Stand By Me in Yawara! A Fashionable Judo Girl. Rika is married to bass player of Foghat, World XXI, and Michael Fath, Dave Crigger. They live in the US with their three children.

References

External links 
 Ever Lasting Song
 Dave Crigger Website
 

1971 births
Living people
Musicians from Ōita Prefecture
21st-century Japanese singers
21st-century Japanese women singers